Orconectes incomptus is a species of crayfish in the family Cambaridae. It is endemic to Tennessee. It is also known as the Tennessee cave crayfish.

References

Cambaridae
Fauna of the United States
Endemic fauna of Tennessee
Freshwater crustaceans of North America
Crustaceans described in 1972
Taxa named by Horton H. Hobbs Jr.
Cave crayfish